Zakkari Dempster (born 27 September 1987) is an Australian former professional racing cyclist, who competed professionally between 2006 and 2019 for the SouthAustralia.com–AIS,  and  teams.

He was selected for the 2014 Tour de France finishing the race in 151st position on the General Classification. Outside of cycling Dempster worked part-time as a fitness coach with Australian rules football team Carlton Football Club during the southern hemisphere summer between 2010 and 2013.

Major results

2003
 3rd Team pursuit, National Novice Track Championships
 3rd Time trial, National Novice Road Championships
2004
 Commonwealth Youth Games
1st Individual pursuit
1st Scratch
2nd Points race
 1st  Team pursuit, National Junior Track Championships
 3rd Team pursuit, National Track Championships
2005
 National Junior Track Championships
1st  Individual pursuit
1st  Points race
2nd Team pursuit
2nd Madison
 2nd Overall National Junior Road Time Trial Series
 3rd Team pursuit, UCI Juniors World Championships
2006
 1st Bendigo Madison (with Mitchell Docker)
 2nd Team pursuit, National Track Championships
 3rd Points race, Oceania Track Championships
 3rd Time trial, Oceania Road Championships
2007
 Oceania Track Championships
1st  Team pursuit
2nd Scratch
2nd Points race
 1st  Time trial, National Under-23 Road Championships
 National Track Championships
1st  Scratch
1st  Team pursuit
2nd Individual pursuit
3rd Points race
 1st Overall Gippsland Tour
1st Stage 5
 3rd Team pursuit, 2007–08 UCI Track Cycling World Cup Classics (Sydney)
2008
 1st Melbourne to Warrnambool Classic
 1st Stage 1 Tour of Japan
 3rd Individual pursuit, National Track Championships
2009
 1st  Team pursuit, Oceania Track Championships
 5th Overall Tour de Hokkaido
2011
 1st Overall Tour Doon Hame
 1st Rutland–Melton International CiCLE Classic
 1st Severn Bridge Road Race
 5th Overall Ronde de l'Oise
1st Stage 1
2012
 1st Stage 2 Czech Cycling Tour
 4th Tartu GP
 9th Trofeo Palma de Mallorca
2013
 6th RideLondon–Surrey Classic
2014
 1st Stage 1 Bay Classic Series
2016
 6th Grand Prix of Aargau Canton
2017
 7th London–Surrey Classic
2018
 4th Ronde van Drenthe
 7th Nokere Koerse
2019
 1st Veenendaal–Veenendaal Classic
 8th Omloop Mandel-Leie-Schelde
 9th Schaal Sels

Grand Tour general classification results timeline

References

External links

1987 births
Living people
Australian male cyclists
Australian track cyclists
Australian Institute of Sport cyclists
Cyclists from South Australia